Tortoise Wins by a Hare is a Merrie Melodies cartoon released on February 20, 1943, and directed by Bob Clampett. It stars Bugs Bunny and Cecil Turtle. It is a sequel to 1941's Tortoise Beats Hare, with footage from said cartoon briefly shown at the beginning. It is also the first short to feature Robert McKimson's design of Bugs Bunny.

Plot
Two years after the events in Tortoise Beats Hare, Bugs is watching footage of that cartoon, determined to learn how it was that Cecil managed to beat him (the cartoon seems to depict Cecil as having won fairly, rather than the truth, which was that the turtle engaged his cousins to cheat and help him win, which Bugs found out). Bugs then goes to Cecil's house disguised as an old man (a parody of Bill Thompson's "Old Timer" character from Fibber McGee and Molly) to ask about the turtle's secret for winning. Cecil is not the least bit fooled by the disguise, but goes along with the gag, claiming that his streamlined shell ensures his success; he produces a set of blueprints for his "air-flow chassis." He also adds that, in contrast, the long ears of a rabbit only serve as "wind resistance", which slows the rabbit down. The turtle ends the conversation with the comment, "Oh, and another thing...Rabbits aren't very bright, either!" just before slamming the door in the enraged bunny's face. Not getting the hint that the turtle's story is a humbug, Bugs builds a shell of his own and prepares for the new race.

Meanwhile, the bunny mob learns of the match-up, places all its bets on Bugs, and hints that "the toitle" will not even finish the race. Initially, Bugs takes the easy lead, after dressing up in his new chassis. The rabbit mob, mistaking Bugs for Cecil and, despite Bugs' insistence to the contrary, attack the rabbit. Cecil does not help Bugs' cause by dressing up in a rabbit suit. The rabbit mob fall for it and cheer Cecil as the real rabbit, causing the turtle to remark to the audience, "I told you rabbits aren't very bright." Bugs still manages to regain the lead and nearly wins, until the mob stalls him right at the finish line, while other rabbits rush Cecil over the line and to victory. Bugs then bursts out crying, rips off his chassis and reveals that he was the real rabbit. In despair, realizing they just helped Cecil win again, and thus lost everything they put on Bugs to win, the rabbit mob replies, "Ehhh, now he tells us," and kill themselves with a single bullet through all their heads.

Production Crew
Supervision: Robert Clampett
Story: Warren Foster
Animation: Robert McKimson (As Bob McKimson)
Additional Animation: Rod Scribner, Virgil Ross, Sid Sutherland, Manny Gould
Layout and Backgrounds: Thomas McKimson, Michael Sasanoff
Character Designer: Robert McKimson
Musical Direction: Carl W. Stalling
Producer: Leon Schlesinger

Voice Actors 
Mel Blanc as Bugs Bunny, Cecil Turtle, Narrators, Rabbit Bookie, Rabbit Thugs and Mrs. Turtle
Kent Rogers as Rabbit with Telescope
Michael Maltese as Various Rabbit Thugs
Tedd Pierce as Various Rabbit Thugs

Analysis
The animated short contains wartime references. Bugs displays "A" and "C" ration cards. He claims he has a secret weapon. A Japanese cruiser is mentioned in a newspaper headline, as is the accurate prediction of Adolf Hitler's suicide two years later. A chorus of turtles sing "He did it before and he can do it again".

Nichola Dobson mentions the short as an example of both Bob Clampett's attention to detail and of the fast pace of his work.

The suicide gag at the end is normally edited out of television broadcasts, fading out just as the rabbits say, "NOW he tells us."

Reception
Animation historian Jerry Beck writes, "One of the things that most fans of director Bob Clampett's cartoons relish is that he would do almost anything to create a funny cartoon. That meant he would violate established character personality traits and traditional story points to get laughs. Here, he not only shreds the Aesop fable and Disney's 1935 short The Tortoise and the Hare but also Tex Avery's send-up of this famous race. The results are priceless... Only Clampett could twist his characters into such pretzels, and put them through the emotional wringer, with such hilarious results."

Home media
This short was released, uncut and uncensored, on Looney Tunes Golden Collection: Volume 1 and Looney Tunes Platinum Collection: Volume 2.

Sources

See also
Rabbit Transit

References

External links

Tortoise Wins by a Hare at the Big Cartoon Database

1943 films
1943 short films
1943 animated films
American track and field films
Merrie Melodies short films
Films about organized crime in the United States
Films directed by Bob Clampett
Self-reflexive films
Films based on the Tortoise and the Hare
Films scored by Carl Stalling
Films produced by Leon Schlesinger
Bugs Bunny films
1940s Warner Bros. animated short films
1940s English-language films